Andrew Vaughn (born 1998) is an American professional baseball player.

Andrew Vaughn may also refer to:
Andrew Vaughn, character in The Mechanic
Andrew C. Vaughn House, Franklin, Tennessee